Senator Camacho may refer to:

Carlos Camacho (1924–1979), Senate of Guam
Felix Perez Camacho (born 1957), Senate of Guam